The Peace Maker is a pamphlet written by author Udney Hay Jacob in 1842. The original two-chapter  pamphlet was published in Nauvoo, Illinois, with Joseph Smith, the founder of the Latter Day Saint movement, listed as the printer. The pamphlet advocated polygamy. While Smith quickly and publicly disavowed any connection to the work, historians continue to debate the possibility that some aspects of the pamphlet may have represented Smith's thought.

The history of the pamphlet is still shrouded in mystery. Jacob was not a member of the Church of Jesus Christ of Latter Day Saints when it was published. However, Jacob and his family had lived among the Latter Day Saints in Chautauqua County, New York, in the early 1830s and in the Latter Day Saint region of Hancock County, Illinois throughout the period of settlement there. Additionally, Jacob was baptized into the church in 1843, the year after his pamphlet appeared.

Smith denounced the pamphlet in the December 1, 1842, issue of Times and Seasons, the official church newspaper, writing:

There was a book printed at my office, a short time since, written by Udney H. Jacob, on marriage, without my knowledge; and had I been apprised of it, I should not have printed it; not that I am opposed to any man enjoying his privileges; but I do not wish to have my name associated with the authors, in such an unmeaning rigmarole of nonsence , folly, and trash. JOSEPH SMITH.

However, other sources raise the possibility that this statement may have been misleading.  In particular, John D. Lee's 1877 "Confessions" states, speaking about the 1842–43 period:

During the winter Joseph, the Prophet, set a man by the name of Udney Hay Jacob to select from the Old Bible scriptures as pertained to polygamy, or celestial marriage, to write it in pamphlet form, and to advocate that doctrine. This he did as a feeler among the people, to pave the way for celestial marriage.

This two chapter pamphlet deals in substantial part with Biblical marriage laws. The text offers several defenses of polygamy that were later used extensively by the Church of Jesus Christ of Latter-day Saints (LDS Church), the Latter Day Saint sect which later migrated to Utah and defended the practice, arguing that polygamy produces greater marital unity than monogamy. The pamphlet also argues vigorously that male authority over females should be absolute and is of divine origin. The text has been influential in the development of 20th- and 21st-century Latter Day Saint polygamous movements.

Notes

References

.
.

External links
Online Copy of "The Peace Maker"
PDF Copy of "The Peace Maker"
"The Peace Maker", digital scan of an original copy held by the Harold B. Lee Library, Brigham Young University

1842 books
Latter Day Saint movement in Illinois
Latter Day Saint texts
Pamphlets
1842 in Christianity
Works about polygamy in Mormonism